Friedrich Uhde may refer to 
 Fritz von Uhde, a German painter.
 Friedrich Uhde (engineer), a German engineer, founder of Uhde GmbH, a company specialized in building industrial plants.